Paul Gray (born 12 August 1969) is an Australian cross-country skier. He competed at the 1992 Winter Olympics and the 1998 Winter Olympics.

References

External links
 

1969 births
Living people
Australian male cross-country skiers
Olympic cross-country skiers of Australia
Cross-country skiers at the 1992 Winter Olympics
Cross-country skiers at the 1998 Winter Olympics
Skiers from Melbourne
20th-century Australian people